The Notre Dame Journal of Formal Logic is a quarterly peer-reviewed scientific journal covering the foundations of mathematics and related fields of mathematical logic, as well as philosophy of mathematics. It was established in 1960 and is published by Duke University Press on behalf of the University of Notre Dame. The editors-in-chief are Curtis Franks and Anand Pillay (University of Notre Dame).

Abstracting and indexing 
The journal is abstracted and indexed in:

According to the Journal Citation Reports, the journal has a 2012 impact factor of 0.431.

References

External links 
 
 Journal page at Notre Dame University
 Journal page at Project Euclid

Mathematical logic
Mathematics journals
Logic journals
Philosophy of mathematics literature
Duke University Press academic journals
Quarterly journals
Publications established in 1960

University of Notre Dame academic journals